The Martian is a 2015 British-American science fiction film directed by Ridley Scott and starring Matt Damon. With the screenplay by Drew Goddard, based on the Andy Weir's 2011 novel of the same name. The film premiered at the 2015 Toronto International Film Festival on September 11, 2015, while the London premiere was held on September 24, 2015. The film was released in the United Kingdom on September 30, 2015 and in the United States on October 2, 2015, distributed by 20th Century Fox in 2D, 3D, IMAX 3D and 4DX.  The Martian went on to gross over $589 million worldwide, becoming Scott's highest-grossing film to date, as well as the eighth-highest-grossing film of 2015.

The Martian was well received, with an approval rating of 91% on the review aggregator Rotten Tomatoes The film has been critically acclaimed, and has been included in many critics' Top Ten Films of 2015 lists. The film has received many industry awards and nominations including 16 Best Picture, 10 Best Director (for Scott) and 11 Best Actors (for Damon) nominations at different organizations and associations. It was recognized at several major Awards Ceremonies, including the Golden Globe Award for Best Motion Picture – Musical or Comedy, six BAFTA and seven Academy Award nominations, including Best Picture and Best Adapted Screenplay for Goddard, and the 2016 long form Hugo Award for Best Dramatic Presentation. Damon won the Golden Globe Award for Best Actor – Motion Picture Musical or Comedy and was nominated for several awards including the Academy Award for Best Actor, the BAFTA Award for Best Actor in a Leading Role, and the Critic's Choice Award for Best Actor.

The Martian was named Film of the Year by National Board of Review also winning Best Director, Best Actor and Best Adapted Screenplay. Ranked at position eight, it won the Top Ten Films of the year award at African-American Film Critics Association. It received eight nominations from Satellite Awards including Best Film, Best Director, Best Actor – Motion Picture, Best Screenplay – Adapted and Best Visual Effects.

Accolades

See also
 2015 in film

Notes

References

External links 
 

Lists of accolades by film